Ballyclaverty is a townland of 339 acres in County Antrim, Northern Ireland. It is situated in the civil parish of Donegore and the historic barony of Antrim Upper.

There is a barrow in the townland registered as Scheduled Historic Monument at grid ref: J2279 9098.

See also 
List of townlands in County Antrim
List of places in County Antrim

References

Townlands of County Antrim
Civil parish of Donegore